Bøler Idrettsforening is a Norwegian sports club from Bøler, Østensjø, Oslo. It has sections for association football, team handball, track and field and tennis. It formerly had a section for Nordic skiing.

It was founded on 24 October 1958. The club colors are yellow and blue.

The women's football team was a part of the inaugural Norwegian Premier League for women in 1987. The team stayed here until 1997, when relegation took place. A women's team currently does not exist.

The men's football team currently plays in the Third Division, the fourth tier of Norwegian football. Its current stint in the Third Division runs from 2006. Well-known players include Kjell Roar Kaasa, Øyvind Bolthof and Dan Alberto Fellus.

References

External links
 Official site 

Football clubs in Oslo
Sport in Oslo
Association football clubs established in 1958
Athletics clubs in Norway
1958 establishments in Norway